Yaen is a 1970 Indian Tamil-language film directed by T. R. Ramanna. It was released on 14 January 1970 and emerged a success.

Plot 
Kamala (Lakshmi) is a girl of marriageable age. She lives with her elder brother (A. V. M. Rajan), her younger pre-teenage brother (Audhinarayanan), and their father (S. R. Veeraraghavan), a factory worker. Kamala meets a singer (Ravichandran), who is an aspiring lawyer. They fall in love, but Kamala doubts whether they can be together due to her social status. A villain (M. R. R. Vasu) lusts for Kamala and goes after her.

Kamala's father suddenly dies, and she receives a marriage proposal shortly thereafter. She is to marry a rich but significantly older man (V. S. Raghavan). She goes to live with him but he treats her poorly. Audhinarayanan loses a leg in an accident. One day, he goes missing, but Raghavan does not allow Kamala to search for him. Enraged, Rajan shoots Raghavan and is arrested. He later successfully escapes from prison. Meanwhile, Vasu places a time bomb in Kamala's house with an intention kill the family. Kamala's dog collects the bomb, and brings it to Audhinarayanan, who is in the forest. Eventually, Rajan takes it from Audhinarayanan and saves him, but the bomb explodes and kills Rajan. Kamala and Ravichandran are ultimately united.

Cast 
Lakshmi as Kamala
Ravichandran
A. V. M. Rajan
Vennira Aadai Nirmala
Audhinarayanan
M. R. R. Vasu

Production 
Yaen was directed by T. R. Ramanna, and produced by E. V. Rajan for EVR Films. It was written by Subbu Arumugam, based on a story by Krishna. Cinematography was handled by G. Durai. Shooting took place at the studios Vasu and AVM.

Themes 
The film questions why destiny plays games with people's lives. Its title Yaen, meaning "why", refers to this.

Soundtrack 
The soundtrack was composed by T. R. Pappa.

Varuvaya Vel Muruga   S. P. Balasubramaniam

Release 
Yaen was released on 14 January 1970. The film commercially successful, running for over ten weeks in theatres.

References

External links 
 

1970 films
1970s Tamil-language films
Films directed by T. R. Ramanna
Films scored by T. R. Pappa